The Jiabao V75 and the Jiabao V77 are a five- to eight-seater Microvan made by FAW Jilin under the Jiabao sub-brand, with the V77 being the long version based on the V75.

Overview

Launched in 2015, the Jiabao V75 is powered by a 75 hp 1.0 liter Inline-three petrol engine and the Jiabao V77 is powered by either a 75 hp 1.0 liter Inline-four petrol engine or an 88 hp 1.3 liter Inline-four petrol engine. The Jiabao V75 is priced between 28,900 yuan and 30,900 yuan and the longer Jiabao V77 priced between 30,900 yuan and 35,900 yuan. There is also a 304 mm longer version spawned called the Jiabao V55 with a single model priced at 32,900 yuan, which is powered by the same engine.

References

External links
Official Jiabao V75/V77 website

Jiabao V75
Rear-wheel-drive vehicles
Microvans
2010s cars
Cars introduced in 2015
Cars of China